Francesco Montemezzano  or Monte Mezzano (Verona, 1555 – after 1602) was an Italian painter of the late-Renaissance or Mannerist period.

Life and career
He was born near Verona, and appears to have been a follower, if not a pupil, of Paolo Veronese. He was active both in Venice and the mainland, painting mainly sacred subjects.

He completed some of the panels for the church of San Nicolò dei Mendicoli in the  Venetian district of Dorsoduro. Ridolfi in a short biography notes that Francesco gave himself excessively to the pleasures of love, fell in love with expensive objects and this led to an early death by poisoning.

In media
He was featured in an episode of the BBC One television programme Fake or Fortune? that aired on 19 July 2015 (Series 4, Episode 3), in which a large painting of the Lamentation of Christ at an English church (St John the Baptist Church in Tunstall, Lancashire) was investigated and verified as being by the artist.

Gallery

References

External links

Italian Paintings, Venetian School, a collection catalog containing information about Montemezzano and his work (see index; plate 49).

1540 births
1602 deaths
16th-century Italian painters
Italian male painters
Painters from Verona
Painters from Venice
Mannerist painters
Deaths by poisoning